The following list is a discography of production by Kirk Knight, an American record producer and rapper who is a member of the hip hop collective Pro Era. It includes a list of songs produced, co-produced and remixed by year, artist, album and title.

Singles produced

2012

Pro Era – The Secc$ Tap.e
 03. "Flight 13" 
 10. "Update"

Capital Steez – AmeriKKKan Korruption
 09. "HYPE Beast"

Joey Badass – Rejex
 08. "Fantom"
 09. "Silent Night"
 12. "Update"

Capital Steez – AmeriKKKan Korruption Reloaded
 09. "HYPE Beast" 
 19. "Herban Legend"
 21. "Apex"

Pro Era – PEEP: The aPROcalypse
 06. "Florists"

2013

Eckō Unltd. – Underground Airplay
 01. "Relaxation"
 05. "Lift Up"

Peter Rosenberg and Eckō Unltd. – Underground Airplay 2: The New York Renaissance
 05. "Scotty"

Joey Badass – Summer Knights
 01. "Alowha"
 05. "Right On Time"
 16. "#LongLiveSteelo"

Joey Badass – Summer Knights EP
 05. "#LongLiveSteelo"

2014

Pro Era – The Secc$ Tap.e 2
 03. "Pussy Facx" 
 08. "Far"

Smoke DZA – Dream.ZONE.Achieve
 06. "Fhvt BVsturd"

Mick Jenkins – The Water[s]
 15. "Jerome"

Pro Era – The Shift
 01. "Extortion" 
 04. "On My Life"

2015

Joey Badass – B4.DA.$$
 05. "Big Dusty"
 06. "Hazeus View"

Kirk Knight – Late Knight Special
 01. "Start Running"
 02. "Heaven Is for Real"
 03. "Brokeland"
 04. "5 Minutes" 
 05. "Knight Time"
 06. "One Knight" 
 07. "Scorpio"
 08. "Down"
 09. "I Know" 
 10. "Dead Friends" 
 11. "The Future" 
 12. "All for Nothing"

2016

Nyck Caution – Disguise the Limit
 03. "Baptize"
 05. "Basin"
 06. "Show No Love" 
 07. "Just In Case" 
 10. "Wordsmith"
 12. "Out of Reach"

Kirk Knight – Black Noise
 01. "Flight 14"
 02. "Plastic Dream"
 03. "Mute"
 04. "Ai"
 05. "Young Ones"
 06. "Flexible"
 07. "Memories"
 08. "Retrograde"
 09. "Lay It Down"
 10. "Magic Mirror"
 11. "Magic Mirror"

CJ Fly - Flytrap
 03. "IDGAF"

2017

Joey Bada$$ – All-Amerikkkan Bada$$
 03. "Temptation"
 04. "Land of the Free"
 05. "Devastated"
 08. "Ring the Alarm"

Nyck @ Knight – Nyck @ Knight
 01. "Off the Wall"
 02. "All Night"
 04. "Dial Up"
 05. "Perfect Murder"
 06. "Headlights"
 07. "Audiopium"
 08. "Wake Up"

A$AP Ferg − Still Striving
 08. "Plain Jane"
 13. "Nandos"

References
Notes

Citations

External links
 
 
 

Production discographies
Hip hop discographies
Discographies of American artists